Tuxtla  is a genus of Mesoamerican flowering plants, in the family Asteraceae.

Species
There is only one known species, Tuxtla pittieri, native to Costa Rica and to the Los Tuxtlas region in the State of Veracruz in eastern Mexico.

References

Heliantheae
Flora of Veracruz
Flora of Costa Rica